Henry James William Wheeler (27 March 1840 – 29 October 1908) was an English cricketer.  Wheeler's batting and bowling styles are unknown.  He was born on Gibraltar.

Wheeler made his one and only first-class appearance for Middlesex in 1864 against Sussex at the Royal Brunswick Ground in Brighton.  In this match he scored 44 runs in two innings, with a high score of 27 and a batting average of 22.00, while in the field he took a single catch.

References

External links
Henry Wheeler at Cricinfo
Henry Wheeler at CricketArchive

1840 births
1908 deaths
English cricketers
Middlesex cricketers
Gibraltarian cricketers